Zaq (stylized as ZAQ, born March 16, 1988) is a Japanese singer-songwriter, lyricist, composer and arranger signed to Lantis.

Biography
Zaq began to learn the piano at age three. During her college years, her idol was Minori Chihara, and it was during this time she decided to become a singer. However, she failed all her auditions. In junior high school, Zaq's favorite bands were Mongol800 and Going Steady, two rock groups which she was addicted to. She is self-taught in composing and her works were characterized by a unique style which is unrestricted by music theory and musicology.

She started writing songs for other artists in 2012, and made her solo debut with Lantis with the single "Sparkling Daydream" released on October 24, 2012; the title song is used as the opening theme to the 2012 anime series Love, Chunibyo & Other Delusions. Her second single "Alteration" was released on January 23, 2013, and the title song is used as the opening theme to the 2013 anime series Sasami-san@Ganbaranai. They were released on October 21 and 23, 2014, respectively, and were used as the second opening theme for High School DxD New and the opening theme for I Couldn't Become a Hero, So I Reluctantly Decided to Get a Job..

On January 29, 2014, Zaq released her fifth single, "Voice", which is used as the opening theme for the second season of Love, Chunibyo & Other Delusions. On April 16, 2014, she released her first album, Noisy Lab.. She then again released another single, "Overdriver" on August 20, 2014, and is used for the anime Rail Wars! as the ending theme.

On June 12, 2016, Zaq had her first concert in the United States. This concert was at the Atlantic City Convention Center in New Jersey as part of the AnimeNEXT 2016 convention.

On July 13, 2016, Zaq released her second album No Rule My Rule. It was released in two editions: a standard edition, and a limited edition which includes a music video, a making-of video, and recordings of live performances. Her third album Z-ONE was released on May 16, 2018.

Discography

Albums

Singles

Other anime songs (composed or sung)
Love, Chunibyo & Other Delusions
Black Raison d'être (Maaya Uchida, Chinatsu Akasaki, Azumi Asakura and Sumire Uesaka):
"Inside Identity"
"Outsider"
"Secret Survivor"
"Van!shment Th!s World"
"February Magic"
Rikka Takanashi (Maaya Uchida):

"-Across the line"
 by Shinka Nibutani (Chinatsu Akasaki)
 by Kumin Tsuyuri (Azumi Asakura)
"Dark Death Decoration" by Sanae Dekomori (Sumire Uesaka)
ZAQ:

Future Diary
 by Yoshihisa Kawahara
Hidamari Sketch x Honeycomb
 by Kana Asumi, Kaori Mizuhashi, Yūko Gotō, Ryōko Shintani, Chiaki Omigawa and Hitomi Harada
Saki Achiga-hen episode of Side-A
"SquarePanicSerenade" by Aoi Yūki, Nao Tōyama, Kana Hanazawa, Mako and Yumi Uchiyama
"Futuristic Player" by Miyuki Hashimoto
"Yes!!
"Little Pray" and "Tōnan Seihoku Uchidaore World ver. Ryūka" by Kaori Ishihara
So, I Can't Play H!
"Reason why XXX" by Sayaka Sasaki
Non Non Biyori
 by Rie Murakawa, Ayane Sakura, Kana Asumi and Kotori Koiwai
 by Rie Murakawa, Ayane Sakura, Kana Asumi and Kotori Koiwai
Bocchi The Rock!

References

External links
Official blog 

1988 births
Anime musicians
Japanese women pop singers
Lantis (company) artists
Living people
Musicians from Kagoshima Prefecture
21st-century Japanese singers
21st-century Japanese women singers